Orthophytum vagans is a plant species in the genus Orthophytum.

The bromeliad is endemic to the Atlantic Forest biome (Mata Atlantica Brasileira)  in Espírito Santo state, located in southeastern Brazil.

Cultivars
 Orthophytum 'Blaze'
 Orthophytum 'Copper Penny'
 × Neophytum 'Hytime'
 × Ortholarium 'Hades'

References

BSI Cultivar Registry Retrieved 11 October 2009

vagans
Endemic flora of Brazil
Flora of Espírito Santo
Flora of the Atlantic Forest